Chamber of Furniture Industries of the Philippines (CFIP) is a non-stock, non-profit trade association of furniture manufacturers, suppliers and service providers in the Philippines.  The association was established in September 1966 and incorporated in 1967. It operates the annual Philippine International Furniture Show.

References
The Manila Times: Saturday, January 08, 2005 - Wellness concept reaches out to furniture trends Coverage of Philippine International Furniture Show.
United States Department of Agriculture. GAIN Report. States: "The Philippine International Furniture Show (PIFS) is the premier furniture show in the. country..."

External links
Philippine International Furniture Show

Manufacturing trade associations
Furniture companies of the Philippines
Trade associations based in the Philippines